Lefkoşa District is a district of Northern Cyprus. It is divided into two sub-districts: Lefkoşa Sub-district and Değirmenlik Sub-district. Its population is 97,293 according to the 2011 census. Its Governor is Kemal Deniz Dana.

Güzelyurt District has been separated from Lefkoşa District. Some parts of the Larnaca District of the Republic of Cyprus are administered by the Lefkoşa district.

References 

 
Districts of Northern Cyprus